Litwinki  is a village in the administrative district of Gmina Nidzica, within Nidzica County, Warmian-Masurian Voivodeship, in northern Poland.

In 1679, Litwinki was one of the villages where King John III Sobieski settled his Muslim soldiers.

References

Litwinki